Mountain Madness is a  Seattle-based mountaineering and trekking company. The company specializes in mountain adventure travel and has a training school for mountain and rock climbing.

History

Fischer and Krause
In 1984, Scott Fischer, Wes Krause, and Michael Allison, each a mountaineering guide, co-founded Mountain Madness. Although Fischer had decided in the early 1970s that he would one day have a guide service named Mountain Madness, the founders did not incorporate the company until 1984. Fischer anchored the Seattle operations while Krause concentrated his efforts in Africa. Allison soon sold his share to his partners so that he could pursue other interests.

While leading Mountain Madness, Fischer became renowned for his ascents of the world's highest mountains without the use of supplemental oxygen. He and Wally Berg were the first Americans to summit Lhotse, the world's fourth highest mountain (27,940 feet / 8516 m), located next to Mount Everest.  Fischer and Ed Viesturs were the first Americans to summit K2 (28,251 feet / 8611m), in the Karakoram of Pakistan, without supplemental oxygen.

During his stewardship of Mountain Madness, Fischer led social and environmental initiatives to help people in the countries in which Mountain Madness traveled. As the leaders of the 1994 Sagarmatha Environmental Expedition, Fischer and Rob Hess both summited Mount Everest without supplemental oxygen. Later that year, the American Alpine Club awarded the David Brower Conservation Award, "an annual award recognizing leadership and commitment to preserving mountain regions worldwide," to all members of the expedition. Fischer also led the 1996 Climb for CARE expedition on Mount Kilimanjaro (19,341 feet / 5,895 m) in Africa. This endeavor raised nearly a million dollars for the relief organization.

After 23 years of mountaineering and 12 years of guiding Mountain Madness, Fischer died in the 1996 Mount Everest disaster while leading an expedition and descending from summit.

The Boskoffs
In 1997, the year after Scott Fischer's death, the Boskoffs purchased Mountain Madness. Christine  and Keith Boskoff had met each other at a climbing gym and after a time, got married. Christine was an aeronautical engineer and Keith an architect, but climbing became a bigger part of their lives, and Christine soon left her job to climb full-time with Keith. They purchased Mountain Madness in 1997, and under their guidance it found increasing success. Christine climbed six of the world's fourteen 8000 meter peaks, a feat unequalled by any other American woman at the time.

In 1999 Keith died, leaving his widow Christine to run Mountain Madness on her own. She led expeditions for about three months that year and planned to ring in the year 2000 on the top of Mount Kilimanjaro, with a group of climbing clients. Other famous losses in the climbing community during this period, besides Scott and the Everest losses, were Alison Hargreaves in 1995 and Alex Lowe in 1999.

With a renewed commitment to teaching important mountaineering skills, Mountain Madness broadened its adventure travel offerings to include a new genre of trips: "adventure treks" that include both trekking and climbing options. The company earned an accreditation by the American Mountain Guides Association as a commitment to "high technical standards, strong programs, and a quality staff of engaged and engaging climbing instructors and guides."

Like her predecessor, Boskoff was committed to social issues. She served on the board of Room to Read, an international organization dedicated to improving education in developing countries,  

and through Mountain Madness, she led a fund-raising climb of Mount Baker, the third highest mountain in Washington state (10,781 feet / 3,286 m), to benefit the organization's long-term goal of helping 10 million children. Boskoff worked with the Central Asia Institute as well, an organization in Bozeman, Montana that promotes and supports community-based education, primarily in Pakistan and Afghanistan, by building schools, training teachers, and funding scholarships.

Nine years into her tenure as the owner and leader of Mountain Madness, in the fall of 2006, Boskoff and Charlie Fowler, another well-known American climber and Mountain Madness guide, died in an avalanche while climbing near Lenggu Monastery on Genyen Mountain, in Sichuan Province in southwest China.

Mark Gunlogson
The loss of both of the company's owners presented new challenges for Mountain Madness, so in 2008, Mark Gunlogson, who began guiding for Mountain Madness in 1993, took over. Since 2000, he had been the company's business operations manager, and he is currently the president and majority owner. Mountain Madness continues to operate as a well-known and respected international adventure travel company. Mountain Madness currently concentrates on expeditions to the Seven Summits, on mountaineering schools, and on trekking.

Contributing to social causes
Mountain Madness endeavors to assist those who live in the places where its guides and clients visit. It works directly with special populations, donates trips for fundraising events, and collaborates with a variety of relief agencies, conservation groups, and NGOs. During the course of many of the adventures it leads, Mountain Madness encourages clients to help local school programs, work on community projects, and visit conservation areas.

People of MM
Scott Fischer (d. 1996)
Anatoli Boukreev (d. 1997)
Keith Boskoff (d. 1999)
Christine Boskoff (d. 2007)
Charlie Fowler (d. 2007)
Wes Krause
Michael Allison
Jaime Pollitte
Mark Gunlogson (current owner)

See also
Adventure Consultants

References

Bibliography

External links

Adventure travel
Climbing organizations
Transport companies established in 1984
Ecotourism
-
Mountaineering in the United States
1984 establishments in Washington (state)